"Cuestión de Prioridades por el Cuerno de África" is a charity single recorded by Melendi featuring Dani Martín, Pablo Alborán, La Dama, Rasel, Malú and Carlos Baute.

In 2011, some 13 million people were suffering the effects of famine on the Horn of Africa. Melinda wanted to help and sought assistance from a number of other artists to record a song with proceeds of the song going towards helping the children of Africa in collaboration with The Save the Children Fund.

The single was released in Spain on 20 January 2012 as a digital download and peaked at number 36.

Track listing

Chart performance

Release history

References

2012 singles
Pablo Alborán songs
All-star recordings
Charity singles